Toradora! is a Japanese manga series written by Yuyuko Takemiya and illustrated by Zekkyo, based on the light novel series of the same name. It was serialized in MediaWorks' shonen manga magazine Dengeki Comic Gao!, but since May 2008 it is serialized in ASCII Media Works' manga magazine Dengeki Daioh. North American publisher Seven Seas Entertainment published the first volume in English language in March 2011. In Indonesia, Elex Media Komputindo published the first volume in July 2011 in Indonesian. In México, Editorial Kamite published the first volume in January 2016 in Spanish.

Volume list

See also

List of Toradora! episodes

References

External links 
 

Toradora
Toradora!